|}
{| class="collapsible collapsed" cellpadding="0" cellspacing="0" style="clear:right; float:right; text-align:center; font-weight:bold;" width="280px"
! colspan="3" style="border:1px solid black; background-color: #77DD77;" | Also Ran

The 2012 Epsom Derby (known as the Investec Derby for sponsorship reasons) was the 233rd annual running of the Derby horse race. It took place at Epsom Downs Racecourse on 2 June 2012.

The race was won by Camelot, the 8/13 favourite ridden by jockey Joseph O'Brien and trained by his father Aidan O'Brien.

As usual, in attendance at Epsom was Queen Elizabeth II to mark the start of a national holiday weekend celebrating her Diamond Jubilee as per official plans announced twelve months prior.

Race details
 Sponsor: Investec
 Winner's prize money: £751,408
 Going: Good to firm
 Number of runners: 9
 Winner's time: 2 minutes, 33.90 seconds

Full result

Winner details
Further details of the winner, Camelot:

 Foaled: 5 March 2009, in Ireland
 Sire: Montjeu; Dam: Tarfah (Kingmambo)
 Owner: Derrick Smith, Sue Magnier and Michael Tabor
 Breeder: Sheikh Abdulla bin Isa Al-Khalifa

Form analysis

Two-year-old races
Notable runs by the future Derby participants as two-year-olds in 2011:
 Camelot – 1st in Racing Post Trophy
 Bonfire - ''3rd in Critérium International

The road to Epsom
Early-season appearances in 2012 and trial races prior to running in the Derby:
 Camelot – 1st in 2,000 Guineas Stakes
 Cavaleiro - 3rd in Lingfield Derby Trial
 Bonfire – 1st in Dante Stakes
 Astrology – 1st in Dee Stakes
 Main Sequence – 1st in Lingfield Derby Trial
 Mickdaam – 4th in UAE Derby; 1st in Chester Vase
 Minimise Risk - 5th in Chester Vase
 Rugged Cross - 3rd in Fairway Stakes
 Thought Worthy - 1st in Fairway Stakes

Subsequent Group 1 wins
Group 1 / Grade I victories after running in the Derby:
 Camelot – Irish Derby (2012)
 Main Sequence - United Nations Stakes (2014), Sword Dancer Invitational Handicap (2014), Joe Hirsch Turf Classic Invitational Stakes (2014), Breeders' Cup Turf (2014)

Subsequent breeding careers
Leading progeny of participants in the 2012 Epsom Derby.

Sires of Classic winners
Camelot (1st)
 Latrobe - 1st Irish Derby (2018)
 Even So - 1st Irish Oaks (2020)
 Athena - 1st Belmont Oaks (2018)
 Sir Erec - 1st Spring Juvenile Hurdle (2019)

Other Stallions
Astrology (3rd) - Exported to Saudi ArabiaMinimise Risk (7th) - Exported to America - Exported to Venezuela

References

External links
 
 sportinglife.com

Epsom Derby
Epsom Derby
Epsom Derby
Epsom Derby
 2012
2010s in Surrey